Felipe Mundim Nunes (born 20 May 1990) is a Brazilian professional footballer who plays as an attacking midfielder for Songkhla.

Club career
Born in Gama, Distrito Federal, Nunes only made his senior debuts in the São Paulo state, playing for lowly Independente de Limeira. After being an important midfield unit for the side which was promoted in 2011, he joined Grêmio on 20 November 2011.

Initially assigned to the youth side, Nunes made his first-team debut on 2 February 2012, coming on as a late substitute in a 1–0 home win against São Luiz for the Campeonato Gaúcho championship. He only appeared in three further more matches in that year, all from the bench.

On 3 January 2013 Nunes joined Figueirense on loan. However, he returned to Grêmio in May, after being released from Figueira.

After not featuring during the rest of 2013, Nunes moved to Portuguesa in a season-long loan on 17 January 2014. He returned to Grêmio in June, after appearing sparingly with Lusa, but eventually "re-appeared" for the latter in September.

References

External links
Grêmio official profile 

1990 births
Living people
Sportspeople from Federal District (Brazil)
Brazilian footballers
Association football midfielders
Campeonato Brasileiro Série B players
Grêmio Foot-Ball Porto Alegrense players
Figueirense FC players
Associação Portuguesa de Desportos players
Capivariano Futebol Clube players
Botafogo Futebol Clube (SP) players
Clube Atlético Bragantino players
Esporte Clube Passo Fundo players
FC Shukura Kobuleti players
Anápolis Futebol Clube players
Jeddah Club players
Rio Branco Sport Club players
Saudi First Division League players
Expatriate footballers in Georgia (country)
Expatriate footballers in Saudi Arabia
Brazilian expatriate sportspeople in Georgia (country)
Brazilian expatriate sportspeople in Saudi Arabia